The zeta function of a mathematical operator  is a function defined as

for those values of s where this expression exists, and as an analytic continuation of this function for other values of s.  Here "tr" denotes a functional trace.

The zeta function may also be expressible as a spectral zeta function in terms of the eigenvalues  of the operator  by

.

It is used in giving a rigorous definition to the functional determinant of an operator, which is given by

The Minakshisundaram–Pleijel zeta function is an example, when the operator is the Laplacian of a compact Riemannian manifold.

One of the most important motivations for Arakelov theory is the zeta functions for operators with the method of heat kernels generalized algebro-geometrically.

See also 

 Quillen metric

References

 

Functional analysis
Zeta and L-functions